In English folklore, Jack's Land is any area of farmland that is left uncultivated due to either a perceived infertility or 
superstition.  In some regions, the name for such areas is "No Man's Land".

References

English folklore